A Classy Pair is a 1979 studio album by the American jazz singer Ella Fitzgerald, accompanied by the Count Basie Orchestra, with arrangements by Benny Carter.

This was Fitzgerald and Basie's second studio recording after Ella and Basie! (1963), and features re-recordings of two songs from the earlier album, "Honeysuckle Rose" and "Ain't Misbehavin' ". The two musicians worked together much more frequently during her Pablo years than they had during her years on the Verve label, and this album marked the end of a connection that had begun in 1957.

Reception

The Allmusic review by Scott Yanow awarded the album three stars and said that "Basie's sidemen are unfortunately restricted in the Benny Carter arrangements to backup work but Basie has a few piano solos and Fitzgerald is in good voice and in typically swinging form".

Track listing

CD Edition
Some CD editions not only altered the order of the tracklist, also included two tracks without credited them: 5 and 11. Times listed on booklets and backcovers are also usually wrong.

Personnel
 Ella Fitzgerald – vocals
 The Count Basie Orchestra
 Count Basie – piano
 Ray Brown – trumpet
 Sonny Cohn – trumpet
 Pete Minger – trumpet
 Nolan Andrew Smith – trumpet
 Bill Hughes – trombone
 Mel Wanzo – trombone
 Dennis Wilson – trombone
 Mitchell "Booty" Wood – trombone
 Bobby Plater – alto saxophone
 Danny Turner – alto saxophone
 Eric Dixon – tenor saxophone
 Kenny Hing – tenor saxophone
 Charlie Fowlkes – baritone saxophone
 Freddie Green – guitar
 John Clayton – double bass
 Butch Miles – drums
 Benny Carter – arranger, conductor

Credits
 Produced by Norman Granz
 Mastered by Eric Miller and Greg Fulginiti

References

1979 albums
Count Basie Orchestra albums
Ella Fitzgerald albums
Pablo Records albums
Albums arranged by Benny Carter
Albums produced by Norman Granz